Human evolution is the biological process that led to the emergence of the species Homo sapiens(binomial nomenclature for the human species):

"Human evolution" may also refer to:
 Descent of Man, a book by Charles Darwin.
 Human evolution (origins of society and culture) the historical and biological process that lead to the rise of modern human societies.

See also
 List of human evolution fossils
 Creation–evolution controversy
 Human evolution/Species chart
 The Evolution of Man, an album by recording artist Example